What's It Gonna Be may refer to:

 "What's It Gonna Be?!", a 1999 song by Busta Rhymes and Janet Jackson
 "What's It Gonna Be" (Beyoncé song), 2003
 "What's It Gonna Be" (H "Two" O song), 2008
 "What's It Gonna Be?", a 1967 song by Dusty Springfield from The Look of Love
 "What's It Gonna Be", a 1983 song by Bryan Adams from Cuts Like a Knife
 "What's It Gonna Be", a 1988 song by Ratt from Reach for the Sky
 "What's It Gonna Be", a 2000 song by Samantha Mumba from Gotta Tell You
 "What's It Gonna Be", a 2001 song by Brian McKnight from Superhero
 "What's It Gonna Be", a 2001 song by Jessica Simpson from Irresistible
 "What's It Gonna Be?", a 2007 song and viral video by Million Dollar Strong

See also
 
 What's It Gonna Be, Santa?, the resequenced and repackaged version of Chicago XXV: The Christmas Album by Chicago